Club Deportivo Estudiantil CNI (sometimes referred as Estudiantil CNI) is a Peruvian football club, playing in the city of Iquitos, Loreto, Peru.

History
The Club Deportivo Estudiantil CNI was founded on July 30, 1996. 

In 2016 Copa Perú, the club classified to the National Stage, but was eliminated by Venus in the Repechage.

In 2017 Copa Perú, the club classified to the National Stage, but was eliminated when finished in 3rd place.

In 2018 Copa Perú, the club classified to the National Stage, but was eliminated when finished in 27th place.

In 2019 Copa Perú, the club was eliminated in the District Stage when finished in 3rd place.

Honours

Regional
Liga Departamental de Loreto:
Winners (4): 2016, 2017, 2018, 2022

Liga Provincial de Maynas:
Winners (2): 2017, 2022
Runner-up (1): 2016

Liga Distrital de Iquitos:
Winners (1): 2016
Runner-up (2): 2017, 2022

See also
List of football clubs in Peru
Peruvian football league system

References

Football clubs in Peru
Association football clubs established in 1996
1996 establishments in Peru